"Kaks takti ette" was an Estonian television programme, where young vocalists competed each other. The programme lasts 1972–2007. The programme was broadcast on Eesti Televisioon.

Notable participants
Silvi Vrait, Anne Veski, Marju Länik, Siiri Sisask, Pearu Paulus, Hedvig Hanson, Maian Kärmas, Gerli Padar, Tanel Padar, Ewert Sundja, Laura.

Winners
 ...
 1992/1993 Hedvig Hanson
 1994/1995 Tiiu Tulp
 1997 Gerli Padar
 ...

References

Estonian television shows
Music competitions in Estonia
Eesti Televisioon original programming